Padubidri railway station is a station on Konkan Railway. It is at a distance of  down from origin. The preceding station on the line is Innanje railway station and the next station is Nandikoor railway station. Even though station is named Padubidri the station lies near to Paniyooru and Uchila of Udupi district in Karnataka state.

References 

Railway stations along Konkan Railway line
Railway stations in Udupi district
Karwar railway division